Antonie is a surname. Notable people with this surname include the following:

 Colin Antonie (born 1952), former Australian rules footballer
 Peter Antonie (born 1958), Australian former rower
 William Lee Antonie (1764–1815), English politician and Member of Parliament

See also